Specific Area Message Encoding (SAME) is a protocol used for framing and classification of broadcast emergency warning messages.  It was developed by the United States National Weather Service for use on its NOAA Weather Radio (NWR) network, and was later adopted by the Federal Communications Commission for the Emergency Alert System, then subsequently by Environment Canada for use on its Weatheradio Canada service. It is also used to set off receivers in Mexico City and surrounding areas as part of the Mexican Seismic Alert System (SASMEX).

History
From the 1960s to the 1980s, a special feature of the NOAA Weather Radio (NWR) system was the transmission of a single  attention tone prior to the broadcast of any message alerting the general public of significant weather events. This became known as the Warning Alarm Tone (WAT). Although it served NWR well, there were many drawbacks. Without staff at media facilities to manually evaluate the need to rebroadcast an NWR message using the Emergency Broadcast System (EBS), automatic rebroadcasting of all messages preceded by just the WAT was unacceptable and impractical. Even if stations and others with the need were willing to allow for this type of automatic capture, assuming the events for activation were critical, there was no way for automated equipment at the station to know when the message was complete and restore it back to normal operation.

SAME had its beginnings in the early 1980s when NOAA's National Weather Service (NWS) began experimenting with system using analog tones in a dual-tone multi-frequency (DTMF) format to transmit data with radio broadcasts. In 1985, the NWS forecast offices began experimenting with placing special digital codes at the beginning and end of every message concerning life- or property-threatening weather conditions targeting a specific area. The intent of what became SAME was to ultimately transmit a code with the initial broadcast of all NWR messages. However, the roll-out moved slowly until 1995, when the U.S. Government provided the budget needed to develop the SAME technology across the entire radio network. Nationwide implementation occurred in 1997, when the Federal Communications Commission (FCC) adopted the SAME standard as part of its new Emergency Alert System (EAS). In 2003, NOAA established a SAME technology standard for weather radio receivers.

The SAME technique was later adopted by the U.S. Federal Communications Commission (FCC) in 1997 for use in the EAS as well as by Environment Canada for its Weatheradio Canada service in 2004. Much like the original EBS dual-tone , this produces a distinct sound (the ) which is easily recognized by most individuals due to its use in weekly and monthly broadcast tests, as well as weather alert messages. During the said events, viewers and/or listeners will hear these digital codes in the form of buzzes, chirps, and clicking sounds (or what broadcast engineers affectionately call "duck farts") just before the attention signal is sent out and at the conclusion of the voice message.

Format of digital parts

In the SAME system, messages are constructed in four parts, the first and last of which are digital and the middle two are audio. The digital sections of a SAME message are AFSK data bursts, with individual bits lasting 1920 μs (1.92 ms) each, giving a bit rate of 520 bits per second. A mark bit is four complete cycles of a sine wave, translating to a mark frequency of 2083 Hz, and a space bit is three complete sine wave cycles, making the space frequency 1562.5 Hz.

The data is sent isochronously and encoded in 8-bit bytes with the most-significant bit of each ASCII byte set to zero. The least-significant bit of each byte is transmitted first, including the preamble. The data stream is bit and byte synchronized on the preamble.

Since there is no error correction, the digital part of a SAME message is transmitted three times, so that decoders can pick "best two out of three" for each byte, thereby eliminating most errors which can cause an activation to fail.

Header format

The text of the header code is a fixed format:

 <Preamble>ZCZC-ORG-EEE-PSSCCC+TTTT-JJJHHMM-LLLLLLLL-

This is broken down as follows:

1.  A preamble of binary 10101011 (0xAB in hex) repeated sixteen times, used for "receiver calibration" (i.e., clock synchronization), then the letters ZCZC as an attention to the decoder (a message activation method inherited from NAVTEX).

2.  ORG — Originator code; programmed per unit when put into operation
 PEP – Primary Entry Point Station
 President or other authorized national officials
 CIV – Civil authorities
 i.e. Governor, state/local emergency management, local police/fire officials
 WXR – National Weather Service (or Environment Canada.)
 Any weather-related alert
 EAS – EAS Participant
 Broadcasters. Generally only used with test messages.
 EAN – Emergency Action Notification Network (No longer used.)
 Used to send Emergency Action Notifications. (No longer used, replaced by PEP.)

3.  EEE — Event code; programmed at time of event

4.  PSSCCC — Location codes (up to 31 location codes per message), each beginning with a dash character; programmed at time of event
 In the United States, the first digit (P) is zero if the entire county or area is included in the warning, otherwise, it is a non-zero number depending on the cardinal location of the emergency within the area. The remaining five digits are the FIPS state (SS) and county code (CCC). The entire state may be specified by using county code 000 (three zeros).
 In Canada, all six digits make up a Canadian Location Code, which corresponds to a specific forecast region as used by the Meteorological Service of Canada. All forecast region numbers are six digits with the first digit always zero.

5.  TTTT — Purge time of the alert event (from exact time of issue)
 In the format hhmm, using 15-minute increments up to one hour, using 30-minute increments up to six hours, and using hourly increments beyond six hours.  Weekly and monthly tests sometimes have a 12-hour or greater purge time to assure users have an ample opportunity to verify reception of the test event messages; however; 15 minutes is more common, especially on NOAA Weather Radio's tests.
 For short term events (like a tornado) this value could be set to 0000 (four zeros), which will purge the warning immediately after the message has been received.  However, this is not typical, and FCC guidelines suggest a minimum of 15 minutes purge time.
 The purge time is not intended to coincide with the actual end of the event.  Longer events that may not end for days (like hurricanes) may have a purge time of only a few hours.  That an event message has been purged does not indicate or imply that the threat has passed.

The National Weather Service is changing the maximum purge time for alerts on NOAA Weather Radio from 6 hours to 99.5 hours by summer 2023 to address long duration events purging before the event begins. 

6.  JJJHHMM — Exact time of issue, in UTC, (without time zone adjustments).
 JJJ is the Ordinal date (day) of the year, with leading zeros
 HHMM is the hours and minutes (24-hour format), in UTC, with leading zeros

7.  LLLLLLLL — Eight-character station callsign identification, with "/" used instead of "–" (such as the first eight letters of a cable headend's location, WABC/FM for WABC-FM, KLOX/NWS for a weather radio station programmed from Los Angeles, or EC/GC/CA for a Weatheradio Canada station).

Each field of the header code is terminated by a dash character, including the station ID at the end; individual PSSCCC location numbers are also separated by dashes, with a plus (+) separating the last location from the purge time that follows it.

Full message format
An EAS message contains these elements, in this transmitted sequence:

 Header.
 Attention signal — Sent if any message is included (normally sent with all messages except RWT on broadcast radio/TV); must be at least eight seconds long.  (On weather radio in Canada the 1050 Hz tone is only used with three event codes: RMT, SVR & TOR)
 Single  audio tone used by NOAA Weather Radio.
 Combined  tones for broadcast radio/TV.
 Message — An audio message. The FCC permits encoded video or text in lieu of an audio message, but neither are implemented in practice.
 Tail — (Preamble) NNNN (EOM).

There is one second of blank audio between each section, and before and after each message. For those used to packet communications systems where each packet has a checksum, note that there is no checksum used in the message format. The header and EOM are transmitted 3 times, and the receiver is obliged to implement columnar parity correction.

The combined tones date back to 1976 when they were made part of the Emergency Broadcast System, the EAS' predecessor.

Event codes
There are roughly 80 different event codes that are used in EAS. These codes are defined federally by the FCC for use in the EAS system and publicly by the Consumer Electronics Association (CEA) standard for SAME protocol weather radio receiver decoder units.

All but the first six of these used to be optional and could be programmed into encoder/decoder units at the request of the broadcaster. However, a July 12, 2007 memo by the FCC now requires mandatory participation in state and local level EAS by broadcasters. Furthermore, the creation and evolution of a voluntary standard by the CEA in December 2003 has provided participating manufacturers of weather radio receivers a single definitive reference to use when designing and programming receivers. In addition, some receiver manufacturers have added an additional layer as to whether or not an event code can be user-suppressed (e.g., a Hurricane Warning in a Midwest US State) or will never be allowed to be suppressed (e.g., Nuclear Power Plant Warning).

Key for event code tables
{| class="wikitable"
! colspan=2 | USA type key
! colspan=2 | CAN/MEX type key
! colspan=2 | Event level key
|-
| M || Mandatory code
| AB || Administrative bulletin
| style="background-color: #90FF90;" | ADV || Advisory
|-
| O1 || Original optional code
| CI || Currently implemented
| style="background-color: #FFFF90;" | WCH || Watch
|-
| O2 || 2002 optional code
| RT || Required test
| style="background-color: #FF9090;" | WRN || Warning
|-
| O3 || 2017 optional code
| FI || For future implementation
| style="background-color: white;" | TEST || Test
|-
| NI || Not implemented
| NI || Not implemented
| ||
|-
| ||
| TS || Testing for Implementation
| ||
|}

Event codes in use:

The following event codes have been implemented by agencies in the United States and/or Canada, and CIRES A.C. in Mexico.

{| class="wikitable sortable" style="text-align: center"
! scope="col" width="40" | Event Code
! scope="col" width="40" | U.S. Type
! scope="col" width="40" | CAN. Type
! scope="col" width="40" | MEX. Type
! scope="col" width="400" | Event Description
! scope="col" width="50" | Event Level
|-
| ADR || O1 || AB || NI || Align="Left"| Administrative Message || style="background-color: #90FF90;" | ADV
|-
| AVA || O2 || FI || NI || Align="Left"| Avalanche Watch || style="background-color: #FFFF90;" | WCH
|-
| AVW || O2 || FI || NI || Align="Left"| Avalanche Warning || style="background-color: #FF9090;" | WRN
|-
| BLU || O3 || NI || NI || Align="Left" | Blue Alert|| style="background-color: #FF9090;" | WRN
|-
| BZW || O1 || CI || NI || Align="Left"| Blizzard Warning || style="background-color: #FF9090;" | WRN
|-
| CAE || O2 || FI || NI || Align="Left"| Child Abduction Emergency || style="background-color: #90FF90;" | ADV
|-
| CDW || O2 || FI || NI || Align="Left"| Civil Danger Warning || style="background-color: #FF9090;" | WRN
|-
| CEM || O1 || FI || NI || Align="Left"| Civil Emergency Message || style="background-color: #FF9090;" | WRN
|-
| CFA || O2 || FI || NI || Align="Left"| Coastal Flood Watch || style="background-color: #FFFF90;" | WCH
|-
| CFW || O2 || FI || NI || Align="Left"| Coastal Flood Warning || style="background-color: #FF9090;" | WRN
|-
| DMO || O1 || AB || NI || Align="Left"| Practice/Demo Warning (Or simply just Practice/Demo on NOAA Weather Radio). || style="background-color: white;" | TEST
|-
| DSW || O2 || CI || NI || Align="Left"| Dust Storm Warning || style="background-color: #FF9090;" | WRN
|-
| EAN || M || FI || NI || Align="Left"| National Emergency Message (Formerly known as Emergency Action Notification.) (Begins a nationwide EAS activation) (implemented on a very select few of NOAA Weather Radio Stations.)|| style="background-color: #FF9090;" | WRN
|-
| EAT || NI || FI || NI || Align="Left"| Emergency Action Termination (previously ended a nationwide EAS activation) (No longer used after 2012.)|| style="background-color: #90FF90;" | ADV
|-
| EQW || O2 || FI || CI || Align="Left"| Earthquake Warning|| style="background-color: #FF9090;" | WRN
|-
| EVI || O1 || FI || NI || Align="Left"| Evacuation Immediate (Or Immediate Evacuation on NOAA Weather Radio.) || style="background-color: #FF9090;" | WRN
|-
| EWW || O3 || NI || NI || Align="left"| Extreme Wind Warning || style="background-color: #FF9090;" | WRN
|-
| FFA || O1 || FI || NI || Align="Left"| Flash Flood Watch || style="background-color: #FFFF90;" | WCH
|-
| FFS || O1 || FI || NI || Align="Left"| Flash Flood Statement || style="background-color: #90FF90;" | ADV
|-
| FFW || O1 || FI || NI || Align="Left"| Flash Flood Warning || style="background-color: #FF9090;" | WRN
|-
| FLA || O1 || FI || NI || Align="Left"| Flood Watch || style="background-color: #FFFF90;" | WCH
|-
| FLS || O1 || FI || NI || Align="Left"| Flood Statement || style="background-color: #90FF90;" | ADV
|-
| FLW || O1 || FI || NI || Align="Left"| Flood Warning || style="background-color: #FF9090;" | WRN
|-
| FRW || O2 || FI || NI || Align="Left"| Fire Warning || style="background-color: #FF9090;" | WRN
|-
| FSW || NI || CI || NI || Align="Left"| Flash Freeze Warning || style="background-color: #FF9090;" | WRN
|-
| FZW || NI || CI || NI || Align="Left"| Freeze Warning (also known as a "Frost Warning" in Canada.) || style="background-color: #FF9090;" | WRN
|-
| HLS || O1 || FI || TS|| Align="Left"| Hurricane Local Statement || style="background-color: #90FF90;" | ADV
|-
| HMW || O2 || FI || NI || Align="Left"| Hazardous Materials Warning || style="background-color: #FF9090;" | WRN
|-
| HUA || O1 || CI || TS || Align="Left"| Hurricane Watch || style="background-color: #FFFF90;" | WCH
|-
| HUW || O1 || CI || TS || Align="Left"| Hurricane Warning || style="background-color: #FF9090;" | WRN
|-
| HWA || O1 || FI || NI || Align="Left"| High Wind Watch || style="background-color: #FFFF90;" | WCH
|-
| HWW || O1 || CI || NI || Align="Left"| High Wind Warning || style="background-color: #FF9090;" | WRN
|-
| LAE || O2 || FI || NI || Align="Left"| Local Area Emergency || style="background-color: #90FF90;" | ADV
|-
| LEW || O2 || FI || NI || Align="Left"| Law Enforcement Warning || style="background-color: #FF9090;" | WRN
|-
| NAT || NI  || AB || NI || Align="Left"| National Audible Test || style="background-color: white;" | TEST
|-
| NIC || M || AB || NI || Align="Left"| National Information Center (typically used to follow up an Emergency Action Notification) || style="background-color: #90FF90;" | ADV
|-
| NMN || O2 || AB || NI || Align="Left"| Network Notification Message || style="background-color: #90FF90;" | ADV
|-
| NPT || M || AB || NI || Align="Left"| National Periodic Test || style="background-color: white;" | TEST
|-
| NST || NI  || AB || NI || Align="Left"| National Silent Test || style="background-color: white;" | TEST
|-
| NUW || O2 || FI || NI || Align="Left"| Nuclear Power Plant Warning || style="background-color: #FF9090;" | WRN
|-
| RHW || O2 || FI || NI || Align="Left"| Radiological Hazard Warning || style="background-color: #FF9090;" | WRN
|-
| RMT || M || RT || NI || Align="Left"| Required Monthly Test || style="background-color: white;" | TEST
|-
| RWT || M || RT || CI || Align="Left"| Required Weekly Test || style="background-color: white;" | TEST
|-
| SMW || O2 || TS || NI || Align="Left"| Special Marine Warning || style="background-color: #FF9090;" | WRN
|-
| SPS || O1 || FI || NI || Align="Left"| Special Weather Statement || style="background-color: #90FF90;" | ADV
|-
| SPW || O2 || FI || NI || Align="Left"| Shelter In-Place warning|| style="background-color: #FF9090;" | WRN
|-
| SQW || O1 || CI || NI || Align="Left"| Snow Squall Warning || style="background-color: #FF9090;" | WRN
|-
| SSA || O3 || NI || NI || Align="left"| Storm Surge Watch || style="background-color: #FFFF90;" | WCH
|-
| SSW || O3 || NI || NI || Align="left"| Storm Surge Warning || style="background-color: #FF9090;" | WRN
|-
| SVA || O1 || CI || NI || Align="Left"| Severe Thunderstorm Watch || style="background-color: #FFFF90;" | WCH
|-
| SVR || O1 || CI || NI || Align="Left"| Severe Thunderstorm Warning || style="background-color: #FF9090;" | WRN
|-
| SVS || O1 || TS || NI || Align="Left"| Severe Weather Statement (U.S., CAN) || style="background-color: #90FF90;" | ADV
|-
| TOA || O1 || CI || NI || Align="Left"| Tornado Watch || style="background-color: #FFFF90;" | WCH
|-
| TOE || O2 || FI || NI || Align="Left"| 911 Telephone Outage Emergency || style="background-color: #90FF90;" | ADV
|-
| TOR || O1 || CI || NI || Align="Left"| Tornado Warning || style="background-color: #FF9090;" | WRN
|-
| TRA || O2 || CI || NI || Align="Left"| Tropical Storm Watch || style="background-color: #FFFF90;" | WCH
|-
| TRW || O2 || CI || NI || Align="Left"| Tropical Storm Warning || style="background-color: #FF9090;" | WRN
|-
| TSA || O1 || TS || NI || Align="Left"| Tsunami Watch || style="background-color: #FFFF90;" | WCH
|-
| TSW || O1 || TS || NI || Align="Left"| Tsunami Warning || style="background-color: #FF9090;" | WRN
|-
| VOW || O2 || FI || CI || Align="Left"| Volcano Warning|| style="background-color: #FF9090;" | WRN
|-
| WSA || O1 || CI || NI || Align="Left"| Winter Storm Watch || style="background-color: #FFFF90;" | WCH
|-
| WSW || O1 || CI || NI || Align="Left"| Winter Storm Warning|| style="background-color: #FF9090;" | WRN
|-
| ??A || O2 || CI || NI || Align="Left"| Unrecognized Watch || style="background-color: #FFFF90;" | WCH
|-
| ??E || O2 || CI || NI || Align="Left"| Unrecognized Emergency || style="background-color: #90FF90;" | ADV
|-
| ??S || O2 || CI || NI || Align="Left"| Unrecognized Statement || style="background-color: #90FF90;" | ADV
|-
| ??W || O2 || CI || NI || Align="Left"| Unrecognized Warning || style="background-color: #FF9090;" | WRN
|}
* Unrecognized Alerts are only seen on NOAA Weather Radios. This is typically due to poor reception, or for newly-implemented event codes, an older radio does not recognize it.
** While the CEA standard lists the FZW event code as "Freeze Warning", Environment Canada refers to it as a "Frost Warning".  However, it will be displayed as a "Freeze Warning" on receivers that are compliant to the CEA standard.
† Environment Canada additionally uses the WSW event code to refer to any of the following weather conditions: Blowing Snow Warning, Freezing Drizzle Warning, Freezing Rain Warning, Snowfall Warning, Snow Squall Warning
*** The EQW and VOW event codes are used in Mexico as part of the Mexican Seismic Alert System (also known as SASMEX). EQW is referred as "Alerta Sísmica", while VOW is referred to as "Alerta Volcánica". Other event codes are being tested, such as Hurricane Warning (HUW), Hurricane Watch (HUA) and Hurricane Statement (HLS). Required Weekly Tests (RWT) are conducted every three hours to make sure receivers are working properly.
**** The FCC created the BLU code for Blue Alerts beginning on December 14, 2017.
*****The FCC in 2012 modified protocol for national EAS activations. Emergency Action Notifications are now treated as any other EAS alert (except that it is mandatory to air), eliminating the need for Emergency Action Terminations, so the FCC removed it from operation.
Internal use only:

Receiver decoders that comply to the CEA standard will neither display the messages below, nor activate a warning tone if applicable.  While the message will be stored in memory, it will not be displayed to the user.  The FCC has also designated these event codes as being for "internal use only", and not for display.  Environment Canada lists these messages as "Administrative Bulletins".

{| class="wikitable sortable" style="text-align: center"
! scope="col" width="40" | Event Code
! scope="col" width="40" | U.S. Type
! scope="col" width="40" | CAN. Type
! scope="col" width="400" | Event Description
! scope="col" width="50" | Event Level
|-
| TXB || O2 || AB || align="left"| Transmitter Backup On || style="background-color: #90FF90;" | ADV
|-
| TXF || O2 || AB || align="left"| Transmitter Carrier Off || style="background-color: #90FF90;" | ADV
|-
| TXO || O2 || AB || align="left"| Transmitter Carrier On || style="background-color: #90FF90;" | ADV
|-
| TXP || O2 || AB || align="left"| Transmitter Primary On || style="background-color: #90FF90;" | ADV
|} The above events are only seen on NOAA Weather Radio if certain situations happen, such as a station losing power. In this case, the "TXB" or "Transmitter Backup On" code would be transmitted, following by beeping noises of multiple frequencies, finally followed by EOM tones. However, these tones are not typically transmitted over the air.

Future implementation:

The following codes are part of the CEA standard for receiver decoders, but are not listed as being in use by any agencies in the United States.  Environment Canada lists these codes as being "for future implementation". None of these event codes are being implemented in Mexico, as Mexico's network is for seismic and volcanic alerts at this time.

{| class="wikitable sortable" style="text-align: center"
! scope="col" width="40" | Event Code
! scope="col" width="40" | U.S. Type
! scope="col" width="40" | CAN. Type
! scope="col" width="400" | Event Description
! scope="col" width="50" | Event Level
|-
| BHW || NI || FI || align="left"| Biological Hazard Warning || style="background-color: #FF9090;" | WRN
|-
| BWW || NI || FI || align="left"| Boil Water Warning || style="background-color: #FF9090;" | WRN
|-
| CHW || NI || FI || align="left"| Chemical Hazard Warning || style="background-color: #FF9090;" | WRN
|-
| CWW || NI || FI || align="left"| Contaminated Water Warning || style="background-color: #FF9090;" | WRN
|-
| DBA || NI || FI || align="left"| Dam Watch || style="background-color: #FFFF90;" | WCH
|-
| DBW || NI || FI || align="left"|Dam Break Warning || style="background-color: #FF9090;" | WRN
|-
| DEW || NI || FI || align="left"| Contagious Disease Warning || style="background-color: #FF9090;" | WRN
|-
| EVA || NI || FI || align="left"| Evacuation Watch || style="background-color: #FFFF90;" | WCH
|-
| FCW || NI || FI || align="left"| Food Contamination Warning || style="background-color: #FF9090;" | WRN
|-
| IBW || NI || FI || align="left"| Iceberg Warning || style="background-color: #FF9090;" | WRN
|-
| IFW || NI || FI || align="left"| Industrial Fire Warning || style="background-color: #FF9090;" | WRN
|-
| LSW || NI || FI || align="left"| Landslide Warning || style="background-color: #FF9090;" | WRN
|-
| POS || NI || FI || align="left"| Power Outage Advisory || style="background-color: #90FF90;" | ADV
|-
| WFA || NI || FI || align="left"| Wild Fire Watch || style="background-color: #FFFF90;" | WCH
|-
| WFW || NI || FI || align="left"| Wild Fire Warning || style="background-color: #FF9090;" | WRN
|}

The FCC established naming conventions for EAS event codes.  The third letter of the code must be one of the following.
{| class="wikitable sortable" style="text-align: center"
! scope="col" width="100" | Third letter of event code
! scope="col" width="50" | Category
! scope="col" width="500" | Description
|-
| W || style="background-color: #FF9090;" | Warning || align="left"| An event that alone poses a significant threat to public safety and/or property, probability of occurrence and location is high, and the onset time is relatively short.
|-
| A || style="background-color: #FFFF90;" | Watch || align="left"| Meets the classification of a warning, but either the onset time, probability of occurrence, or location is uncertain.
|-
| E || style="background-color: #90FF90;" | Emergency || align="left"| An event that, by itself, would not kill, injure or do property damage, but indirectly may cause other things to happen that result in a hazard.
|-
| S || style="background-color: #90FF90;" | Statement || align="left"| A message containing follow up information to a warning, watch, or emergency.
|}
The exception to this convention is for "TOR" (tornado warning), "SVR" (severe thunderstorm warning), "EVI" (evacuation immediate), "EAN, EAT, NIC" (the EAS national activation codes), and "ADR" (administrative messages).

On weather radio receivers

There are many weather/all-hazards radio receivers that are equipped with the SAME alert feature, which allows users to program SAME/FIPS/CLC codes for their designated area or areas of their interest and/or concern rather than the entire broadcast area. (For example, a person living in Irving, Texas, would program a FIPS code for Dallas County. However, if there is a need to know of severe weather from the west and northwest ahead of time, the user would program additional FIPS codes for Denton and Tarrant Counties.)

On a more specialized receiver, a user has the option to eliminate any SAME alert codes that may not apply to their area such as a "Special Marine Warning" or a "Coastal Flood Warning". Once the SAME header is sent by NOAA/NWS and if it matches the desired code(s), the receivers then decode the event, scroll it on their display screens, and sound an alarm.

Receivers receive on one of the following National Weather Service network frequencies (in MHz): 162.400, 162.425, 162.450, 162.475, 162.500, 162.525, and 162.550. The signals are typically receivable up to 40 miles (80 km) from the transmitters.

In popular culture
 The Iowa State Cyclones football sports program uses a SAME tone at the end of the pregame video before the football team takes the field. The SAME message is followed by the following narration: "This is a Cyclone Weather Alert! Ladies and Gentlemen, radar has indicated a strong storm approaching Jack Trice Stadium. High winds and low visibility are expected. [The opposing team's] fans in the area should seek immediate cover...."
 The EOM (end of message) tone was heard in the movie trailer for Knowing and in the series Jericho in which its familiar emergency use and its increasing cadence create a sense of foreboding.
 It was used in the movie trailers for Olympus Has Fallen and The Purge. The uses have since been heavily discouraged on air by the Federal Communications Commission (outside public service announcements demonstrating SAME and EAS technology), and stations and networks using them (for instance, TBS and WNKY in Bowling Green, Kentucky) in advertising or promotions have been fined for doing so.
 The SAME tones can be heard in the Impractical Jokers episode "Virtual Insanity".
 SAME tones can be heard in the Warzone mode of Call of Duty: Modern Warfare when the arena is about to shrink.
 SAME Tones are heard in the campaign of the popular video game Call of Duty: Modern Warfare 2, prior to the mission “Of Their Own Accord”. Ironically, these tones are decoded down to an EAS Participant issuing a Required Weekly Test on station WLS-TV.
 In the 2020 video game Black Mesa, entire emergency messages with SAME tones can be heard on radios as the player progresses, each describing the game's events with increasing urgency. In January 2015, prior to the game's release on Steam as early access, a website was launched that played back one such message as a teaser.
 SAME tones are used within a genre of videos on video sharing platform sites like YouTube known as "EAS scenarios," which depict fictional emergency situations through a series of fictional EAS broadcasts. The majority of SAME tones used within these videos are valid; though some creators choose to use customized tones to prevent unintentional activation of EAS equipment.

See also
 Common Alerting Protocol (CAP) – A SAME-compatible digital format for multi-system warning coordination.
 METAR – The international meteorological code for an aviation routine weather report.

References

External links
 NOAA Weatherradio SAME coverage maps
 Title 47, Sec. 11.31 et seq., Code of Federal Regulations, EAS Protocol (implementing SAME)

Encodings
Emergency Alert System
NOAA Weather Radio
1997 introductions
1980s establishments in the United States
1997 establishments in the United States